Ivan Yulianovych Kulyk (born Izrail Yudelevich Kulyk; January 14, 1897 – October 10, 1937) was a Ukrainian poet, writer, translator, diplomat and Communist Party activist. He also wrote under the names "R. Rolinato" and "Vasyl Rolenko".

Biography 

Kulyk was born in the city of Shpola, in the Kiev Governorate of the Russian Empire (now in Cherkasy Oblast, Ukraine) into the family of a Jewish teacher. He finished fourth-grade college in Uman where he moved with his parents. There his first poem was published in the Uman newspaper Provincial voice ("Провинциальный голос"), in Russian.

In 1911 he enrolled into the Odessa Art academy. In 1914, together with his parents, he emigrated to the United States. There he worked in the factories and mines in Pennsylvania. He began publishing his poems in the local Russian newspaper New world ("Новый мир"). In 1914 he became a member of the Russian Social Democratic Labour Party (RSDLP).

In spring 1917 Kulyk travelled through the Russian Far East and Siberia, returning to Kyiv where he joined the local revkom. He actively participated in the Kiev Bolshevik Uprising that led to the establishment of the Soviet government in Kyiv. In December 1917 he was elected to the Central Executive Committee of Soviets and the first Soviet government of the Ukrainian SSR (heading the People's Secretariat of the Foreign Affairs). In summer of 1918 together with Vitaliy Primakov participated in the formations of the Red Cossacks military units.

From May 1921 to May 1922 he was a secretary of the Kamyanets-Podilsky branch of the Communist Party (Bolshevik) of Ukraine. There he edited the local newspaper Red Truth, simultaneously teaching history in the Institute of the People's Education. At this time he published his poem the Green heart (1921).

In 1924–1926 he was consul of the Soviet Union in Canada. From September 15, 1930 to June 1932 he returned to Kamyanets-Podilsky as secretary of a raion committee.

He was one of the leaders of the All-Ukrainian Association of the Proletarian Writers (VSPP), and after 1934 became the leader of the Ukrainian Association of Soviet Writers. Along with those duties he also was head of the State Political Publishing house, edited in the Literary newspaper ("Літературнa газетa") and the journal Soviet Literature ("Радянська література").

He was married to the Ukrainian writer Luciana Piontek (1899–1937), an ethnic German.

He was arrested during the Great Purge in 1937, charged with "spying against the Soviet Union" and executed by shooting on October 10, 1937. Earlier, on September 25, 1937, his wife was executed as well for "supporting her husband in anti-state activities".

Further reading 

 Soviet encyclopedia of history of Ukraine, vol. II.
 Encyclopedia of Ukraine. Dictionary part, vol. IV.
 Khmelnytsky Oblast writers: Bibliographical index. Khmelnytsky, 1989.
 Soroka, M. Ivan Kulik, Writers of Ukraine – victims of Stalin's repressions.  Kyiv, 1991.
 Khaim Volkovych Beyder. Secretary of povit committee. Vitchyzna #12 (pp 108–112),  1967.
 Yohanan Petrovsky-Shtern, The Anti-Imperial Choice: The Making of the Ukrainian Jew. Yale University Press, 2009 ISBN 978-0-30-013731-6

External links
 Ivan Kulik at the Ukrainian literature.
 Ivan Kulik at the Ukrayinski Pisni (Ukrainian songs)
 Kryzhanivsky, S. Ivan Kulik. Ukrainian Soviet Encyclopedia.

1897 births
1937 deaths
People from Shpola
People from Zvenigorodsky Uyezd (Kiev Governorate)
Ukrainian expatriates in the United States
American coal miners
Jews from the Russian Empire
Ukrainian Jews
Old Bolsheviks
Russian Social Democratic Labour Party members
Communist Party of Ukraine (Soviet Union) politicians
Members of the All-Ukrainian Central Executive Committee
Jewish Ukrainian politicians
Jewish socialists
Jewish Ukrainian poets
Ukrainian translators
Ukrainian diplomats
People of the Russian Civil War
Great Purge victims from Ukraine
Jews executed by the Soviet Union
Soviet rehabilitations
20th-century translators